Cash on Delivery is the debut studio album by American rapper Ray Cash. It was released on June 27, 2006, by Ghet-O-Vision Entertainment, Sony Urban Music, and Columbia Records. Guest features that contributed were Scarface among others.

Background
In the song "P.A.N.", Cash criticizes bubblegum rap. Also, Cash insinuates that his label Ghet-O-Vision Entertainment and Sony Urban Music before the album's release showed that "it doesn't know what to do with him". The song, "Bumpin' My Music"  and album both reflect a hardcore image of hip-hop. On his debut album, he calls out a number of his inspirations in the album.

Track listing
Wake Up Cleveland  0:58
The Payback  4:01
Bumpin' My Music (featuring Scarface)  4:01
Smokin' & Leanin' / Coppin' N Cappin' (Interlude) (featuring Tucan)  4:40
Fiends, Fiends, Fiends  4:12
Sex Appeal (Pimp in My Own Mind)  4:24
She A G / D Boy Anthem (Interlude)  5:02
Dope Game  3:47
Better Way (featuring Beanie Sigel)  4:08
Fuck Amerikkka  3:13
Livin' My Life  3:27
I'm Gettin'  4:18
The Bomb (featuring Yummy Bingham)  3:01
Pussy Ass Niggas (featuring Pastor Troy, Bun B & T.I.)  3:53
Take It How You Want It  3:22
Here I Stand  4:37

Singles and chart performance

Reception

Critics such as Allmusic called Cash on Delivery a depth hardcore album. Cash released Cash on Delivery under Sony Urban Music/Columbia Records on June 27, 2006. This album reached # 82 and # 41 on the Billboard charts receiving positive reviews []. The album content features wild tracks like "The Bomb" (feat. Yummy Bingham), his first single and least serious "Sex Appeal", and hardcore tracks that include "Payback", "Fuck AmeriKKKa", and the 2006 single, "Bumpin My Music." The single "Fuck AmeriKKKa" pokes at hypocrites, or the system: "the ones who think they have priority, but do nothing at all. He ended the statement in saying "I know what's going on, as he walked the streets, and the images are not real. His first two singles were heavily featured in the Cleveland area. . This album was a pick by Allmusic!

References

2006 debut albums
Ray Cash albums
Albums produced by Rick Rock